Omega is a city in Tift and Colquitt counties in the U.S. state of Georgia. The population was 1,221 at the 2010 census.

History
Omega was originally called Surrey, and under the latter name was founded ca. 1889 when the railroad was extended to that point.

Geography
Omega is located at  (31.339684, -83.595036).

Demographics

2020 census

As of the 2020 United States census, there were 1,318 people, 440 households, and 326 families residing in the city.

2010 census
As of the 2010 United States census, there were 1,221 people living in the city. The racial makeup of the city was 40.0% White, 14.1% Black, 0.5% Native American, 0.7% Asian, 0.7% from some other race and 0.5% from two or more races. 43.5% were Hispanic or Latino of any race.

2000 census
As of the 2000 United States census, there were 1,340 people, 455 households, and 337 families living in the city. The racial makeup of the city was 56.87% White, 16.12% African American, 0.52% Native American, 0.22% Asian, 24.78% from other races, and 1.49% from two or more races. Hispanic or Latino of any race were 35.00% of the population.

There were 455 households, out of which 39.8% had children under the age of 18 living with them, 52.1% were married couples living together, 16.7% had a female householder with no husband present, and 25.9% were non-families. 24.0% of all households were made up of individuals, and 11.0% had someone living alone who was 65 years of age or older.  The average household size was 2.93 and the average family size was 3.50.

In the city, the population was spread out, with 33.4% under the age of 18, 10.1% from 18 to 24, 27.9% from 25 to 44, 17.3% from 45 to 64, and 11.3% who were 65 years of age or older.  The median age was 30 years. For every 100 females, there were 95.9 males.  For every 100 females age 18 and over, there were 93.7 males.

The median income for a household in the city was $26,765, and the median income for a family was $28,938. Males had a median income of $21,050 versus $16,618 for females. The per capita income for the city was $11,014.  About 22.0% of families and 28.9% of the population were below the poverty line, including 43.9% of those under age 18 and 21.9% of those age 65 or over.

References

Cities in Georgia (U.S. state)
Cities in Tift County, Georgia
Cities in Colquitt County, Georgia